Rack Hill is a 10.6 hectare biological Site of Special Scientific Interest in Wiltshire, notified in 1975.

It is also the geographical name of the site of the Roman fort -of which there are now no visible remains- at Brancaster in Norfolk, then referred to as Branodunum.

References

 English Nature citation sheet for the site (accessed 14 August 2006)

External links
 English Nature website (SSSI information)

Sites of Special Scientific Interest in Wiltshire
Sites of Special Scientific Interest notified in 1975